Breakup Buddies is a 2014 Chinese romantic comedy and road film directed by Ning Hao. It stars Huang Bo and Xu Zheng as buddies on a wild 3,000-kilometre cross-country journey from Beijing to Dali City (via Zhangjiajie).

The film premiered at the 2014 Toronto International Film Festival on September 7, 2014, and was released domestically on September 30, 2014. It grossed over $195 million to become one of the highest-grossing films in China.

Plot
Womanizer Hao Yi (Xu Zheng) takes his best friend Geng Hao (Huang Bo) on a road trip to Dali City in Yunnan — China's unofficial capital of one-night stands — to help him recover from a devastating divorce. Years before, Kang Xiaoyu (Yuan Quan) had traversed the same route to Dali where she met her future husband.

Cast

Huang Bo as Geng Hao
Xu Zheng as Hao Yi
Yuan Quan as Kang Xiaoyu
Zhou Dongyu as Zhou Lijuan, a.k.a. "Christina"
Tao Hui as Avatar girl
Yue Xiaojun as an innkeeper
Shen Teng as a bar owner
Zhang Li as a Si Qing
Jiao Junyan as Xiao Bei
Ma Su as Shasha
Liu Meihan 
Xiong Naijin as Kang Xiaoyu's best friend
Liu Yiwei as a cop
Wang Yanhui as a crime boss
Lei Jiayin as a gangster
Yong Mengting as a cosplay girl
Liang Hao as Li Maomao, Zhou Lijuan's boyfriend
Guo Tao as Kang Xiaoyu's attorney (cameo)
Li Chen as Kang Xiaoyu's new lover (cameo)
Xia Yu as Kang Xiaoyu's ex (cameo)

Review
Derek Elley of Film Business Asia gave Breakup Buddies a 7 out of 10, calling it "Ning Hao's maturest film so far" and praising the performances as "strong".

Box office
The film grossed ¥1.16971 billion at the Chinese box office and a total of US$195.3 million internationally. The Guardian's Phil Hoad mentioning the film as one of "a few, giant, isolated local hits".

References

External links
 

2014 films
2010s Mandarin-language films
Chinese comedy-drama films
Films directed by Ning Hao
Films scored by Nathan Wang
Films set in Beijing
Films shot in Beijing
Films set in Hunan
Films shot in Hunan
Films shot in Yunnan
Films set in Yunnan
IMAX films